Snapper, Inc. was an American company, formerly based in McDonough, Georgia, that manufactured residential and professional lawn-care and snow-removal equipment. Snapper was known for its high-quality red "rear-engine" riding lawnmowers that are capable of standing on-end for storage or repairs, and for its invention of the first self-propelled rotary lawn mower. 

Currently Snapper produces two lines, their main line Hi-Vac and Ninja models sold at dealerships, as well as a different line of re-badged mowers branded Snapper sold at department stores. The latter share nothing in common with dealership sold models.

History 

The company began in 1894 as Southern Saw Works.  Later, in the 1940s, as the McDonough Power Company, it was acquired by William Raymond Smith, who changed the company's direction when the lumber industry declined. Smith recognized a need for lawn mowers and patented a mowing blade. With this, he created the "Snappin' Turtle," named so for the way it snapped the grass and for its turtle figurine on the top front of the first model. While mostly known for their lawnmowers, Snapper also built tillers and snow blowers.

Brought under the umbrella of Fuqua Industries in 1967, sales grew from $10 million in 1967 to $260 million in 1987.

In 1976 McDonough Power Equipment registered the trademark Snapper, and adopted that name as its identity. Producing an assortment of yard-care tools, Snapper had facilities in McDonough, Georgia, Beatrice, Nebraska, and Fort Worth, Texas. 

In 1991, Snapper announced the closing of the Texas and Nebraska factories; the Georgia factory was expanded to absorb the production. Fuqua President Lawrence Klamon explained the closures and consolidation by saying that most of the production from Fort Worth was going East of the Mississippi River.

In 2002 Snapper was acquired by Simplicity Manufacturing, which was then acquired by Briggs & Stratton in 2004. Since then the Snapper brand name has been added to products such as weed trimmers, hedge trimmers, leaf blowers, among others.

In 2014 Briggs & Stratton announced the plan to close the Snapper plant in McDonough, Georgia and move production to Briggs & Stratton's factory in Wauwatosa, Wisconsin, saying it made sense to fold the Georgia plant's Snapper operations into the Wauwatosa factory near the company's headquarters where engineering, product research and other departments support manufacturing.

In 2019 Briggs and Stratton announced a plan to restructure the company. This included divesting the final product divisions and concentrating on providing engines and stationary generators. The plan includes selling the Snapper and Snapper Pro lines along with the other brands Ferris, Simplicity, Billy Goat, and the pressure washer and portable generator business, with these sales expected to be complete by the end of 2020.

Briggs exited bankruptcy by selling all assets to KPS Capital Partners. As a result, they did not sell off the brands including Snapper.

Former Locations 
 535 Macon St, McDonough, Georgia 
 Beatrice, Nebraska
 5000 South Fwy, Fort Worth, Texas

References

External links
Snapper, Inc. website
Snapper NXT mowers website
Fast Company: The Man Who Said No to Wal-Mart
Fuqua to close plants in Texas, Nebraska
Closing McDonough factory

Lawn mower manufacturers
Agricultural machinery manufacturers of the United States
Manufacturing companies based in Georgia (U.S. state)
Companies based in Henry County, Georgia
2002 mergers and acquisitions
2005 mergers and acquisitions